The 2021–22 season was the 136th season of competitive football and third consecutive season in the Championship played by Luton Town Football Club, a professional association football club based in Luton, Bedfordshire, England. Luton also competed in the FA Cup and EFL Cup. The season covered the period from 1 July 2021 to 30 June 2022.

Background and pre-season

After leading Luton Town to safety from relegation on the final day of the 2019–20 season, Nathan Jones guided the team to a top-half finish in 2020–21 with their highest points total in the second tier since 1981–82.

Luton Town's first-team pre-season programme began with an away fixture against Hitchin Town, before a week-long training camp at Queen Ethelburga's College in York, North Yorkshire, England, which concluded with a behind-closed-doors match against Rochdale. This was followed by friendlies away to Bedford Town and Boreham Wood, before home fixtures against Portsmouth and Brighton & Hove Albion.

Match results

EFL Championship

League table

Results summary

Play-offs

FA Cup

EFL Cup

Transfers

In

 Brackets around club names indicate the player's contract with that club had expired before he joined Luton.
 * Signed primarily for the under-21 squad

Out

 Brackets around club names indicate the player joined that club after his Luton contract expired.

Loan in

Loan out

Appearances and goals
Source:
Numbers in parentheses denote appearances as substitute.
Players with name and squad number struck through and marked  left the club during the playing season.
Players with names in italics and marked * were on loan from another club for the whole of their season with Luton.
Players listed with no appearances have been in the matchday squad but only as unused substitutes.
Key to positions: GK – Goalkeeper; DF – Defender; MF – Midfielder; FW – Forward

References

Luton Town F.C. seasons
Luton Town